A Cherenkov detector (pronunciation: /tʃɛrɛnˈkɔv/; Russian: Черенко́в)  is a particle detector using the speed threshold for light production, the speed-dependent light output or the speed-dependent light direction of Cherenkov radiation.

Fundamental

A particle passing through a material at a velocity greater than that at which light can travel through the material emits light. This is similar to the production of a sonic boom when an airplane is traveling through the air faster than sound waves can move through the air. The direction this light is emitted is on a cone with angle θc about the direction in which the particle is moving, with cos(θc) =  (c = the vacuum speed of light, n = the refractive index of the medium, and v is the speed of the particle). The angle of the cone θc thus is a direct measure of the particle's speed. The Frank–Tamm formula  = sin2θc gives the number of photons produced.

Aspects
Most Cherenkov detectors aim at recording the Cherenkov light produced by a primary charged particle. Some sensor technologies explicitly aim at Cherenkov light produced (also) by secondary particles, be it incoherent emission as occurring in an electromagnetic particle shower or by coherent emission, for example Askaryan effect.

Cherenkov radiation is not only present in the range of visible light or UV light but also in any frequency range where the emission condition can be met i.e. in the radiofrequency range.

Different levels of information can be used. Binary information can be based on the absence or presence of detected Cherenkov radiation. The amount or the direction of Cherenkov light can be used.

In contrast to a scintillation counter the light production is instantaneous.

Detector types
In the simple case of a threshold detector the mass-dependent threshold energy allows the discrimination between a lighter particle (which does radiate) and a heavier particle (which does not radiate) of the same energy or momentum. Several threshold stages can be combined to extend the covered energy range.

Cherenkov threshold detectors have been used for fast timing and time of flight measurements in particle detectors.

More elaborate designs use the amount of light produced. Recording light from both primary and secondary particles, for a Cherenkov calorimeter the total light yield is proportional to the incident particle energy.

Using the light direction are differential Cherenkov detectors.

Recording individual Cherenkov photon locations on a position-sensitive sensor area, RICH detectors
then reconstruct Cherenkov angles from the recorded patterns. As RICH detectors hence provide information on the particle velocity, if the momentum of the particle is also known (from magnetic bending), combining these two pieces of information enables the particle mass to be deduced so that the particle type can be identified.

See also
Ring imaging Cherenkov detector
Super-Kamiokande

Particle detectors
Russian inventions
Soviet inventions